Emily Thouy (born 26 January 1993) is a French karateka. She became world champion in the women's kumite 55 kg event at the 2016 World Karate Championships held in Linz, Austria.

Career 

She won the gold medal in the women's team kumite event at the 2012 World Karate Championships held in Paris, France. Two years later, at the 2014 World Karate Championships held in Bremen, Germany, she won the silver medal in the women's kumite 55 kg event.

In 2015, she won the gold medal in the women's kumite 55 kg event at the European Games held in Baku, Azerbaijan. In the final, she defeated Jelena Kovačević of Croatia. She won the gold medal in her event at the 2016 World University Karate Championships held in Braga, Portugal.

In 2017, she competed in the women's kumite 55 kg event at the World Games held in Wrocław, Poland. She lost her bronze medal match against Sara Cardin of Italy.

Achievements

References

External links 
 

Living people
1993 births
Place of birth missing (living people)
French female karateka
Karateka at the 2015 European Games
European Games medalists in karate
European Games gold medalists for France
Competitors at the 2017 World Games
20th-century French women
21st-century French women